South Dearborn High School is the sole high school in the South Dearborn Community School Corporation. It is located in Aurora, Indiana.

See also
 List of high schools in Indiana
 Eastern Indiana Athletic Conference
 Aurora, Indiana

References

External links
Official Website

Public high schools in Indiana
Buildings and structures in Dearborn County, Indiana